Shahrak-e Vahdat-e Eslami (also Romanized as Shahrak-e Vaḥdat-e Eslāmī; also known as Vaḥdat-e Eslāmī) is a village in Mazraeh-ye Shomali Rural District, in the Voshmgir District of Aqqala county, Golestan Province, Iran. At the 2006 census, its population was 1,441, in 308 families.

References 

Populated places in Gonbad-e Kavus County